Albert Leroy Padmore (born 17 December 1944) is a former West Indies cricketer, playing two Tests in 1976 and representing the West Indies in World Series Cricket.

He was primarily an off-spin bowler, who was unfortunate in that his career coincided with the emergence of Andy Roberts, Michael Holding and others to give West Indies one of the finest fast bowling attacks in history.  West Indies developed a strategy of playing four fast bowlers and relying on batsmen such as Viv Richards to bowl the few overs of spin needed. This restricted Padmore's opportunities, and he soon signed for World Series Cricket, and was subsequently banned for life when he joined a "rebel" tour to South Africa.

In 1986, Padmore moved to the United States of America and now lives in Miami.

References

1944 births
Living people
Barbadian cricketers
Barbados cricketers
West Indies Test cricketers
World Series Cricket players